"World War Hulks" is a  comic book crossover storyline published by Marvel Comics that ran in 2010 following the "Fall of the Hulks" storyline.

The plot builds on the depowering of Bruce Banner by Red Hulk during the "Dark Reign" storyline and the betrayal of Doc Samson who joined with the Intelligencia to bring about the "Fall of the Hulks" to create an army of Hulks to take over the world. "World War Hulks" also shows the origins of Red Hulk (Thunderbolt Ross) and Red She-Hulk (Betty Ross).

"World War Hulks" is the continuation of an arc that began with the Planet Hulk storyline in 2006–07, that continued into World War Hulk (the Marvel event of 2007), through the short lived Skaar: Son of Hulk and into the last two years of both Hulk titles, which have largely focused on the identity of Red Hulk, the depowering of Bruce Banner, and the arrival of Skaar on Earth. "Incredible Hulks: Dark Son", which brings Skaar's brother Hiro-Kala to Earth, is the end of the arc.

Publication history
The series started with a one-shot called World War Hulks, and ran through the series Hulk and Incredible Hulk; it also included some "Fall of the Hulks" titles, two issues of Hulked-Out Heroes and two special World War Hulks, Captain America Vs. Wolverine  and Spider-Man vs Thor. Also, Hulked Out Heroes revealed the names of the Hulkified versions of those that were turned into Hulks.

The series revealed the identities of both Red Hulk and Red She-Hulk and how they came to be that way. Additionally the series brought back Bruce Banner as the Hulk and set up the fight with his father that Skaar has been longing for.

Plot summary
Ulik resurfaces and is shown to have gone on a multi-state drinking binge. He ends up destroying a train bridge with the disaster being averted by A-Bomb and Marlo Chandler. When Ulik starts choking Marlo, he is defeated by A-Bomb.

While in a fantasy world where Bruce killed the Hulk and the smart heroes joined the smart villains in a machine to help the world and where General Thunderbolt Ross is still alive, Bruce is visited by Doctor Doom who gives him a robot arm. Back at his home (with his imaginary family which consists of Betty Ross, a son, and a daughter), he activates it and wakes up for a moment. He is quickly interrupted by his fantasy son. While playing with his fantasy family, Doctor Doom arrives. Doctor Doom harms his son that then transforms into Skaar forcing Banner to activate the arm and get himself and Doctor Doom back to reality. Meanwhile, Glenn Talbot sends the army to fight the marines that were taking Washington. They receive back up from Skaar, Korg and A-Bomb. The fight continues until the Hulked-Out-Heroes arrive and attack them. Rick says they must find Banner so Skaar launches them to the Hellicarrier where Banner is captive while staying behind to fight Hulked-Out-Heroes consisting of Hulkified versions of Captain America, Thor (referred to as The Mighty Thor), Ms. Marvel, Cyclops (referred to as Hulklops), Iceman (referred to as Icehulk), Storm, Human Torch (referred to as the Hulking Torch), Invisible Woman, and Thing (referred to as No-Thing). Now awake, Banner sees Doctor Doom trying to steal the brains of the smart heroes, since he and the others, including Banner, were still connected to the machine. However, Doom accidentally blows his own brain before being launched off the Intelligencia Helicarrier by Red-She-Hulk. Rick and Skaar then arrive and Skaar stabs Red-She-Hulk with his sword forcing her to revert to her human form revealing her true identity as Betty Ross.

Meanwhile, Red Hulk fight the Hulked-Out-Heroes constantly using their powers against themselves until using Hulklops' power to damage the Helicarrier and then escaping briefly seeing a still trapped Banner until being attacked by the Hulkfied versions of Spider-Man (referred to as Spider-Hulk) and Wolverine (referred to as Wolverage) but beats them with a fastball special. Red-She-Hulk arrives and drains the energy from Red Hulk's body reverting him to General Thunderbolt Ross who quotes "I was General Thunderbolt Ross. I became the very thing I hated most in life. I am the Red Hulk. And for all I've done...I deserve to die..." Meanwhile, Samson tells MODOK and Leader that transforming the heroes into Hulks was not a good idea. He then deduces Leader has feelings for Red She-Hulk. Samson then attacks Leader, but is beaten by MODOK.

With Red She-Hulk's identity exposed, Betty begs for Bruce to kill her, explaining that she was resurrected by the Intelligencia into an uncontrollable mutation. Although she is willing to die, the appearance of Samson (who was involved in her mutation) inspires enough rage in her that she transforms once again, engaging Samson while Banner and Skaar are contacted by the mutated Amadeus Cho who like the Leader has acquired a mutated mind rather than a mutated body. Using Cho's gamma-enhanced intellect, Banner realises that the Hulked-Out Heroes joined by a Hulkified version of Namor (referred to as Hulkmariner) will 'burn out' within twenty-four hours unless the radiation is removed from them. While Amadeus Cho keeps the Intelligencia occupied (even reverting M.O.D.O.K. to his human form during the fight), Banner releases Beast, Mister Fantastic, Black Panther and Henry Pym to help him re-tool the Cathexis Ray Generator so that he can draw the gamma energy out of the heroes. Unfortunately, it is only after he has activated the machine that Banner reveals that he is transferring the gamma energy into himself as he is the only person capable of physically handling that much power. However, at a crucial juncture, the machinery begins to break down from the feedback. Samson steps in and absorbs the additional excess energy, but for unknown reasons his body is unable to absorb the energy as readily as Banner's body can and he is killed by the overload, reduced to a charred skeleton in seconds. As his body finishes absorbing the excess radiation, Bruce transforms back into the Hulk as the Intelligencia's base is destroyed, Skaar being clearly satisfied at this new chance to kill his father.

General Ross then reviews all of his life and then proceeds to absorb energy from the Cosmic Hulk (who had arrived  to attack him) and angrily splits him in two. As Red Hulk, General Ross then attacks The Leader, who had just escaped from Banner and takes the gamma energy out of him, leaving him to suffer for the rest of his life being "Ordinary". Red Hulk then goes to the White House and kills the Glenn Talbot L.M.D. and declares he is in charge quoting "I always suspected that Talbot was an L.M.D. Like with the Ross L.M.D., the Leader wasn't going to let anyone assume command other than himself. This Talbot probably didn't even know he was just a thing. The Glenn Talbot I knew and respected was and will remain dead. In the end, everything is as it should be. I won."

Bruce Banner leaves a video for the heroes telling them how he planned all of these and to allow Skaar to kill him besides saving the civilians. Skaar absorbs energy from the planet (even through the heroes try to stop it) and uses it to attack the Hulk. However, the Hulk decides not to fight him claiming he is not here to fight him, but Skaar then says how Caiera was alive in Sakaar till he allowed Galactus to consume it. This ended up angering the Hulk prompting him to continue the fight. During the fight, Red She-Hulk attacks Skaar and tells Hulk to run but he doesn't. Skaar defeats Red She-Hulk knocking her into a building which is about to collapse on Red She Hulk's impact. Hulk then saves the civilians in the building with a thunder clap kicking up sand to stop the building from collapsing. Hulk and Skaar then continue their fight where Hulk beats Skaar into submission. Skaar realizes that Hulk isn't a monster (something Bruce was training him to kill) after saving the people in the building and tells him they'll work it out. Realising that continuing their struggle to kill the perceived 'monster' that is his son would accomplish nothing except turning him into his father, Bruce returns to human form, and he and Skaar (in his child version) then hug.

Bruce then transforms into Hulk, fully controlling it, and goes back to Washington to battle Red Hulk. Red She-Hulk tries to stop it, but is defeated by She-Hulk. Banner's battle with Red Hulk gets them to the Intelligencia who manage to escape as their battle continues. Their battle eventually ends with Hulk defeating Red Hulk at The Lincoln Memorial, Hulk refusing to kill Red Hulk because of his relationship to Betty even as he informs his adversary that Ross's faked death means that he can never return to his human life now. Later, Banner and Captain Steve Rogers lock Red Hulk up and makes it clear that, given his strength being second to that of the Hulk and his exceptional tactical expertise, they have plans for him.

Titles involved
 Hulk (vol. 2) #22–24
 Incredible Hulk #609–611
 World War Hulks #1
 World War Hulks Hulked-Out Heroes #1–2
 World War Hulks Spider-Man vs. Thor #1–2
 World War Hulks Captain America Vs. Wolverine  #1–2

Collected editions

References

External links
 World War Hulks at Comic Vine